The 1969 NCAA University Division men's basketball tournament involved 25 schools playing to determine the national champion of men's NCAA Division I college basketball. It began on March 8, 1969, and ended with the championship game on March 22 in Louisville, Kentucky. Including consolation games in each of the regions and an overall consolation game, a total of 29 games were played.

UCLA, coached by John Wooden, won the national title with a 92–72 victory in the final game over Purdue, coached by George King. Lew Alcindor of UCLA was named the tournament's Most Outstanding Player.

In the game, John Vallely, the "Money Man", scored 22 points and Alcindor had 37 points, to give UCLA a win over Purdue, which is Wooden's alma mater.  Purdue was hampered due to injuries to starting point guard Billy Keller and forward Herm Gilliam; Purdue had also lost 7'0" center Chuck Bavis to a broken collarbone during the Mideast Regionals against Miami, (OH).  In earlier matchups, Bavis had provided an ample challenge to Alcindor.  Wooden was an All-American guard for the Boilermakers from 1928 to 1932.

Schedule and venues
The following are the sites that were selected to host each round of the 1969 tournament, and their host(s):

First round
March 8
East Region
 Keaney Gymnasium, Kingston, Rhode Island (URI)
 Reynolds Coliseum, Raleigh, North Carolina (North Carolina State)
Mideast Region
 SIU Arena, Carbondale, Illinois (Southern Illinois)
Midwest Region
 Daniel-Meyer Coliseum, Fort Worth, Texas (TCU)
West Region
 Pan American Center, Las Cruces, New Mexico (New Mexico State)

Regional semifinals, 3rd-place games, and finals (Sweet Sixteen and Elite Eight)
March 13 and 15
East Regional, Cole Field House, College Park, Maryland (Maryland)
Mideast Regional, Wisconsin Field House, Madison, Wisconsin (Wisconsin)
Midwest Regional, Ahearn Field House, Manhattan, Kansas (Kansas State)
West Regional, Pauley Pavilion, Los Angeles, California (UCLA)

National semifinals, 3rd-place game, and championship (Final Four and championship)
March 20 and 22
Freedom Hall, Louisville, Kentucky (Louisville)

For the sixth and final time, Freedom Hall and the city of Louisville would host the Final Four. The Final Four would not return to the state of Kentucky again until 1985, when Rupp Arena hosted. For the 1969 tournament, the Midwest & West first round games got their own sites, with the East continuing to have two sites of its own. There were three new venues used, all in the first round. The tournament came to Southern Illinois University for the first time, at SIU Arena, the home of the Salukis. The tournament returned to the Dallas-Fort Worth area and for the first time games were held in Fort Worth, at the Daniel-Meyer Coliseum on the campus of Texas Christian University. In the West, the tournament returned to Las Cruces, with games held at the Pan American Center for the first time. This would be the only time the tournament would come to Carbondale, and would be the last tournament for three other arenas - Ahearn Field House, Keaney Gym and Wisconsin Field House. The tournament has yet to return to Manhattan; future games in the state of Rhode Island have been held at the Providence Civic Center; and while the tournament would come to Wisconsin again in 1984 at Milwaukee, it would not return to Madison until 2002, when the Kohl Center, the replacement for the Field House, would host.

Teams

Bracket
* – Denotes overtime period

East region

Mideast region

Midwest region

West region

Final Four

National third-place game

Regional third-place games

Notes
Three teams - Drake, Purdue and Trinity University - made their tournament debuts. While Drake and Purdue made the Final Four in their first appearances, Trinity, an independent school from San Antonio, did not win their regional quarterfinal game against Texas A&M. This would be Trinity's only appearance in the tournament, as they would drop down to Division II when the NCAA realigned its divisions in 1973.
This tournament also marked the last tournament appearance of Seattle University. The team would leave the NCAA in 1980 due to budgetary cuts, joining the NAIA at that time. However, they would rejoin the NCAA in 2001 and, finally, rejoin Division I in 2009. The Redhawks, as they are now known, have not returned to the tournament since.

See also
 1969 NCAA College Division basketball tournament
 1969 National Invitation Tournament
 1969 NAIA Division I men's basketball tournament
 1969 National Women's Invitation Tournament

References

NCAA Division I men's basketball tournament
Ncaa
Basketball competitions in Louisville, Kentucky
Basketball in the Dallas–Fort Worth metroplex
NCAA
NCAA Division I men's basketball tournament
College sports tournaments in Kentucky